Mussy may refer to:

Mussy-la-Fosse, a commune in the French region of Bourgogne-Franche-Comté
Mussy-sous-Dun, a commune in the French region of Bourgogne-Franche-Comté
Mussy-sur-Seine a commune in the French region of Grand Est

Other uses
Noël Guéneau de Mussy (1813–1885), French physician
Mussy, a portmanteau of "man" and "-ussy" (derived from "pussy") used to denote the male anus

See also
Musy